Kevin Allen Loder (born March 15, 1959) is an American former professional basketball player who was selected by the Kansas City Kings in the first round (17th pick overall) of the 1981 NBA draft. A  swingman born in Cassopolis, Michigan, Loder played in three NBA seasons from 1981 to 1984. He played for the Kings and San Diego Clippers.

In his NBA career, Loder played in 148 games and scored a total of 875 points. His best year as a professional came during his rookie year for the Kings, appearing in 71 games and averaging 6.9 points per game.

On July 18, 2018, the Kansas City Tornadoes hired Kevin Loder as the chief operating officer.   He is also related to The Turner family

References

External links
 Kevin Loder profile at Basketball-Reference.com

1959 births
Living people
Alabama State Hornets basketball players
American men's basketball players
Basketball players from Michigan
Kansas City Kings draft picks
Kansas City Kings players
Kentucky State Thorobreds basketball players
People from Cassopolis, Michigan
San Diego Clippers players
Sarasota Stingers players
Shooting guards
Small forwards